Bold Ruritana (foaled 1990 in Ontario) is a Canadian Thoroughbred Champion racehorse. She was bred and raced by Minshall Farms, the  successful  horse farm at Hillsburgh, Ontario owned and managed by trainer Barbara Minshall and her husband, Aubrey.

Bold Ruritana was out of the mare, Stage Queen, whose grandsire was Graustark and whose damsire was Nearctic. She was sired by Bold Ruckus, a grandson of the very important North American Champion sire, Bold Ruler.

Conditioned for racing by Barbara Minshall, her husband only saw Bold Ruritana race a short time, dying at age sixty-three in November 1993 following complications from a stroke. Bold Ruritana raced on dirt but by age five had become a successful turf horse, winning the 1995 Sovereign Award for Champion Female Turf Horse. She raced in Canada, from a base at Toronto's Woodbine Racetrack, as well as in the United States where she won the 1994 Cardinal Handicap and 1995 Distaff Turf Mile Stakes at Churchill Downs.

In addition to her fourteen career wins, Bold Ruritana finished in the top three in several other important Canadian and American stakes races including:
 1993 - Wonder Where Stakes - 2nd
 1993 - Duchess Stakes - 3rd
 1994 - Canadian Stakes - 2nd
 1994 - Dance Smartly Stakes - 2nd
 1994 - Nassau Stakes - 2nd
 1994 - E. P. Taylor Stakes - 3rd
 1995 - Dance Smartly Stakes - 2nd
 1995 - Yellow Ribbon Stakes - 3rd
 1996 - Canadian Stakes - 2nd
 1996 - Churchill Distaff Turf Mile Stakes - 3rd

Retired after her 1996 racing campaign with earnings of more than $1.1 million, as a broodmare Bold Ruritana had her first foal in 1998 followed by five more, the last born in 2005.

References
 Bold Ruritana's pedigree and partial racing stats

1990 racehorse births
Thoroughbred family 11-c
Racehorses bred in Ontario
Racehorses trained in Canada
Sovereign Award winners